Reading Hardware Company Butt Works, also known as "The Hardware," is a historic factory building located in Reading, Berks County, Pennsylvania.  It was built in 1875, and consists of two wings connected by a boiler house.  They are configured to enclose a courtyard, closed by a brick wall.  The wings are three- and four-stories, and constructed of brick bearing walls with heavy timber framing.  The boiler house has two square, free-standing chimneys and topped by a central lantern monitor.

It was listed on the National Register of Historic Places in 1979.  It is included in the Reading Hardware Company national historic district.

References

Industrial buildings and structures on the National Register of Historic Places in Pennsylvania
Industrial buildings completed in 1875
Buildings and structures in Berks County, Pennsylvania
Historic district contributing properties in Pennsylvania
National Register of Historic Places in Reading, Pennsylvania
1875 establishments in Pennsylvania